Zeta Corvi, Latinised from ζ Corvi, is a star in the constellation Corvus. It is a blue-white main-sequence star of apparent magnitude 5.21. It is a Be star, the presence of hydrogen emission lines in its spectrum indicating it has a circumstellar disk. It is separated by 7 arcminutes from the star HR 4691. The two may be an optical double or a true multiple star system, with a separation of at least 50,000 astronomical units and the stars taking 3.5 million years to orbit each other. HR 4691 is itself double, composed of an ageing yellow-orange giant whose spectral type has been calculated at K0 or G3, and an F-type main-sequence star.

References

Corvus (constellation)
Corvi, Zeta
B-type main-sequence stars
Be stars
Corvi, 5
4696
107348
60189
Durchmusterung objects